The Iona Institute - the business name of Lolek CLG - is an Irish, socially conservative organisation that advocates the advancement and promotion of the Christian religion and its social and moral values. It has been frequently described as a Catholic pressure group. Founded by columnist David Quinn, it was launched publicly in 2007.

Iona promotes conservative Christian values and opposes abortion, euthanasia, same-sex marriage and civil partnerships. It takes the view that crime is rising, family breakdown is increasing, and that drug abuse and other social problems are caused by fewer people obtaining opposite-sex marriages and participating in organised religion. The institute has released a number of reports and has also hosted talks in support of its aims. Quinn and other prominent members have weekly columns in Ireland's mainstream press.

In 2022, Iona was included in a list of extremist groups by the Global Project against Hate and Extremism, for which Iona was reportedly "consider[ing] legal action".

Background
Irish society underwent a period of rapid secularisation during the 1990s and 2000s. In 1992, two referenda established the right to travel abroad to obtain an abortion and the right to information about foreign abortion services. In 1993, homosexuality was decriminalised. The 1995 referendum approved the removal of the constitutional ban on divorce. 

Throughout the 1990s and 2000s, a series of criminal cases and Irish government enquiries established that hundreds of Catholic priests had abused thousands of children over decades. The widespread abuse scandals and cover-ups by Church authorities led to a decline in influence of the Catholic Church in Irish society.

The Iona Institute was formed in 2006 to promote Christian social teachings in an attempt to prevent and reverse the secularisation of Irish society.

Incorporation
"The Iona Institute" is the business name of Lolek CLG, a private company limited by guarantee. The company was incorporated in 2006 as Lolek Ltd; a private limited company. In 2016, the company changed its name to Lolek CLG and adopted a new constitution. "Lolek" is the childhood nickname of Pope John Paul II. Unlike the UK, the word "Institute" is not a protected term in Ireland and can be used in the name of any company. The use of "institute" has been challenged by notable public commentators such as Graham Norton who said "it is just a feeble attempt to give themselves a veneer of considered intellectual respectability." David Norris referred to "the so-called Iona Institute" as "an unelected, unrepresentative group of reactionary, right-wing, religiously motivated people".

Lolek CLG is a company limited by guarantee and does not have share capital or shareholders. The company consists of eight members, whose liability to the company upon winding-up is limited to a maximum of €1 each.

Lolek's current members are: Sean Ascough, Tom Ascough, Patrick Kenny, Susan Hegarty, John Reid, David Quinn, Andrew O'Connell and John Smyth.  

Lolek also has self-described "patrons" associated with the company; the psychiatrist Patricia Casey, columnist Breda O'Brien, Roman Catholic priest Vincent Twomey, and Church of Ireland bishop Ken Clarke. Dr. Angelo Bottone serves as a part-time research officer for the institute.

Ideology
Iona is commonly described as right-wing, conservative Catholic lobby group. 

Lolek's founding memorandum of association states their objective as "[t]he advancement and promotion of the Christian religion, its social and moral values, and the doing of all such other things as are incidental or conductive to the attainment of that object."

In 2013, Iona spokesperson Patricia Casey denied that it was specifically Catholic or Christian, saying "We support the role of religion in society but we're not a religiously-based organisation." In 2014, John Murray said that the Church of Ireland bishop Ken Clarke's becoming a patron proved Iona's stances were "not specific to any particular Christian denomination."

Charitable status
Iona is a registered charity, using the category of "advancement of religion" to qualify. This has also been challenged by David Norris who said "It is the most ideologically driven group I have come across and it is not a charity. I would be very interested to know how it receives charitable status for such a campaigning political group?"

Opponents argued that Iona's activities were political and that it was therefore legally required to register with the Standards in Public Office Commission, which monitors political donations. It did not do so until the middle of the 2015 same-sex marriage referendum campaign, explaining its change of policy was because it wanted to "play a fuller part" in the campaign.

In 2016, Lolek adopted a new constitution which removed prior explicit references to the promotion of Christianity and Christian social and moral values from the object of the company. The 2016 constitution gives the objects for which the company was established to be [t]he promotion and advancement of marriage and religion in society and the doing of all such other things as are incidental or conductive to the attainment of the above object."

Funding
Lolek is required to report its income by filing annual financial statements with the Companies Registration Office. Lolek does not disclose the source of its income other than it consists of private donations received due to its activity in Ireland.

The source of Iona's funding and whether it is compliant with Irish law have been regularly raised in the Irish media, and in Dáil Éireann.
 
In 2021, the European Parliamentary Forum for Sexual and Reproductive Rights published a report, "Tip of the Iceberg", which claimed that the Iona Institute, among others, had received substantial funding from Russia to pursue an anti-gender/anti-trans rights agenda. The Novae Terrae Foundation was identified as the immediate donor to the Iona Institute, after it had in turn benefited from €2.39 million from a Russian-Azerbaijani "laundromat" designed to channel funds to like-minded campaign groups. It states that some of this funding was then routed to the European Christian Political Movement, which campaigns on a socially conservative and Christian right basis. In a blog entry, founder David Quinn called the claim "absurd".

Campaign issues

Marriage

Same-sex marriage

The Iona Institute promotes heterosexual marriage and opposes the extension of the right to marry to same-sex couples. The group previously opposed the introduction of civil partnerships. The group says that children do best when raised by a mother and father, citing a study by Douglas Allen and others published in the journal Demography in 2012. This position has been challenged by groups such as the American Psychological Association, whose stated position is that "the evidence to date suggests that home environments provided by lesbian and gay parents are as likely as those provided by heterosexual parents to support and enable children’s psychosocial growth". The Iona Institute has been accused of misrepresenting the research which underpins its position opposing same-sex marriage. The group was also criticised for invalid interpretations of data to back its claims.

In December 2012 the group released a video on YouTube saying that marriage can only be between a man and a woman and that blocking gay couples from marriage was not discrimination. The video gained notoriety after the institute's YouTube account was temporarily suspended. Its director, David Quinn, alleged censorship. The video was subsequently parodied by activists in favour of same-sex marriage.

On 13 May 2015, in the run up to Ireland's same-sex marriage referendum held on 22 May 2015, Irish historian John A Murphy, wrote to The Irish Times. In his letter, he described the constitutional amendment, which permitted same sex marriage and extended constitutional protection to families based on such marriages, as "grotesque nonsense." Following this, Iona director David Quinn tweeted "Proposed change to marriage 'grotesque nonsense'. ...Great letter by Prof John A Murphy in @IrishTimes today." Quinn was criticised for this tweet by LGBT rights activist Panti, who wrote: "I can think of lots of things that are grotesque. Extending constitutional protection to all families is not one of them. ...I would call it 'fair', 'reasonable', 'compassionate', 'considerate', 'respectful', or even 'the very least we can do'. But not 'grotesque.'"

Marital breakdown claims
An Iona Institute report called "The Fragmenting Family" drew heavily on data from the 2006 census and said that between 1986 and 2006 marital breakdown in Ireland rose by 500%. However, the report was criticised by Fergus Finlay because it used figures from the 1986 census (before divorce was legalised in Ireland), and that the figures actually suggest that marriage breakdown had been slowing down since the 1990s. A 2010 report by the Economic and Social Research Institute (ESRI) states that "[t]he evidence suggests no significant upward shift in marital breakdown as a result of the advent of divorce in 1997".

Submission to the Constitutional Convention
In its submission to the Constitutional Convention, in opposition to same-sex marriage, the group cited a 2002 study conducted by the American non-governmental organisation Child Trends. In its submission, the organisation summarised the report stating that "Research clearly demonstrates that family structure matters for children, and the family structure that helps the most is a family headed by two biological parents in a low-conflict marriage…". Issues were subsequently raised in the Irish Senate as to the accuracy of the report and a response by Carol Emig, president of Child Trends, wrote to the convention and stated that "This Child Trends brief summarizes research conducted prior to 2002, when neither same-sex parents nor adopted parents were identified in large national surveys. Therefore, no conclusions can be drawn from this research about the well-being of children raised by same-sex partners or adoptive parents."

Tax
In 2007 the Institute issued a policy document entitled Tax Individualisation: Time for a Critical Treatment which criticised the government's policy of tax individualisation for married couples as favoring women who choose to work over those who stay at home. The document claimed that families where only one parent stayed at home were discriminated against by the current tax individualisation policy.

In May 2011, the group hosted a conference entitled "Women, home and work: Towards a policy that’s fair to all families", which highlighted the social policies that it says unfairly discriminate in favour of working women over mothers who wish to spend some or all of their working lives at home with their children.

Denominational schools
In March 2009, the organisation commissioned a survey by polling company Red C which showed that only 47% of the population wished to send their children to a Roman Catholic school.

Religious freedom and discrimination against gays and atheists
At an April 2008 conference, the Iona Institute highlighted a posited move by the European Union, which would require Ireland to scrap Section 37 of the Employment Equality Act 2000. Section 37 allows government-funded religious schools and hospitals to discriminate against any employee on any basis except gender if having the employee is "undermining the religious ethos" of the institution. David Quinn, the director of the institute, said that removing the discrimination exemption "could impact very severely on the freedom of action of faith-based schools". This section has been opposed by the Irish National Teachers' Organisation since its introduction.

The Iona institute also believes that employees should not be required to act against their Catholic beliefs by employers. For example, in April 2010, the group supported the stance taken by Dr Phil Boyle, a fertility doctor based in Galway, who will only provide fertility treatment to married couples because of his Catholic beliefs.

Climate change
In September 2019, David Quinn and Maria Steen wrote opinion pieces in national newspapers questioning climate change activists and their refusal to consider the economic impacts of climate change activism on its own. Steen compared some activists to a pagan cult.

Low national birth rate
The Institute is concerned about the low national birth rate. It quotes statistics showing that it has gone below replacement rate: "The Irish Fiscal Advisory Council came up with a report a few days ago, showing that by mid-century 2050 – so 30 years into the future – the number of retired people would have doubled from 14 per cent of the population to 27 per cent. And so you have a diminishing percentage of young people having to look after – through tax and through other things – a fast increasing number of retired people. That's something to be looked at incredibly closely." David Quinn stated that the solution to Ireland’s skewed age ratio is to "help people to have the number of children they want".

Reception and impact
In an article in The Irish Times by Kathy Sheridan on same-sex marriage, the group was described as being "blessed with extremely high-profile members with priceless multimedia platforms" and "'very, very engaged' with politicians".

In an interview in Hot Press magazine, comedian Graham Norton said "I'm actually glad ... the Iona Institute exists. The great thing about extremists is that they drag everyone towards the centre."

In August 2022, the Global Project against Hate and Extremism published a report on the growth of far-right and hate groups in Ireland. The report stated that "white nationalist, anti-LGBTQ+, anti-immigrant, and anti-lockdown groups seem to be coming together and echoing each other’s hateful rhetoric" and identified twelve far-right groups, including the Iona Institute, that had experienced growth in recent years.  The Iona Institute was included due to its anti-LGBT+ stances.

RTÉ payment controversy (a.k.a. "Pantigate")

On 11 January 2014, the Iona Institute said it was defamed when accused of homophobia by the performer and gay rights activist Rory O'Neill in an interview on the Raidió Teilifís Éireann (RTÉ) Saturday Night Show. A payment of roughly €85,000 was made by RTÉ to the Iona Institute and John Waters as part of an out of court agreement. All the litigants from the Iona Institute rejected a right of reply in favour of the payment. Breda O'Brien described a right of reply offer as "completely inadequate". RTÉ's TV director said "Senior counsel was consulted and confirmed that the legal position was far from clear."

The payment caused a controversy, with the Minister for Communications, Pat Rabbitte, and Senators David Norris and Ivana Bacik demanding the reasoning for the payment and in the region of 2000 people attended a protest at the payment. Senator Averil Power said seeking "to completely censor somebody else’s viewpoint by resorting to solicitors’ letters is ridiculous". MEP Paul Murphy said RTÉ's actions were censorship, and further described it as a "real attack on the freedom of speech". Senator Rónán Mullen said that the payments by RTÉ “were a welcome development in the cause of promoting a civil debate."

In a Dáil discussion on the issue, TDs, John Lyons, Jerry Buttimer, Michael Colreavy, Clare Daly, Luke Flanagan, Mick Wallace and Catherine Murphy also criticised the payment.  Then Taoiseach Enda Kenny said to Buttimer that he had no plans to make RTÉ "directly accountable" to the Dáil over the payments. The Index on Censorship commented on the incident, saying "If the Catholic right was more confident in its arguments, it wouldn't attempt to censor the other side".

See also

 Christian right
 Pro Life Campaign
 Youth Defence

References

2007 establishments in Ireland
Think tanks established in 2007
Catholicism in Ireland
Christian organizations established in 2007
Conservatism in Ireland
Anti-abortion organisations in the Republic of Ireland
Opposition to same-sex marriage
Organizations that oppose LGBT rights
Political and economic think tanks based in Europe
Political advocacy groups in the Republic of Ireland
Social conservatism
Think tanks based in the Republic of Ireland